This is a list of all personnel changes for the 1954 NBA off-season and 1954–55 NBA season.

Events

September 17, 1954
 The Baltimore Bullets traded Ray Felix and Chuck Grigsby to the New York Knicks for Alfred McGuire and Connie Simmons.

September 18, 1954
 The Minneapolis Lakers traded Pep Saul to the Milwaukee Hawks for Don Sunderlage.

October 16, 1954
 The Fort Wayne Pistons traded Fred Scolari to the Boston Celtics for Bob Harris.

October 19, 1954
 The Philadelphia Warriors sold Paul Walther to the Fort Wayne Pistons.

October 26, 1954
 The Baltimore Bullets traded Jim Fritsche to the Fort Wayne Pistons for Ken Murray.

November 1, 1954
 The Syracuse Nationals sold Jackie Moore to the Milwaukee Hawks.

November 19, 1954
 Clair Bee resigns as head coach for Baltimore Bullets.

November 28, 1954
 The Philadelphia Warriors sold Gene Shue to the New York Knicks.
 The Rochester Royals selected Don Henriksen from the Baltimore Bullets in the dispersal draft.
 The New York Knicks selected Paul Hoffman from the Baltimore Bullets in the dispersal draft.
 The Boston Celtics selected Bob Houbregs from the Baltimore Bullets in the dispersal draft.
 The Minneapolis Lakers selected Slick Leonard from the Baltimore Bullets in the dispersal draft.
 The Philadelphia Warriors selected Ken Murray from the Baltimore Bullets in the dispersal draft.
 The Fort Wayne Pistons selected Al Roges from the Baltimore Bullets in the dispersal draft.
 The Milwaukee Hawks selected Frank Selvy from the Baltimore Bullets in the dispersal draft.
 The Syracuse Nationals selected Connie Simmons from the Baltimore Bullets in the dispersal draft.
 The Boston Celtics selected Eddie Miller from the Baltimore Bullets in the dispersal draft.
 The Rochester Royals selected Herm Hedderick from the Baltimore Bullets in the dispersal draft.
 The Milwaukee Hawks selected John Barber from the Baltimore Bullets in the dispersal draft.

December 8, 1954
 The Fort Wayne Pistons claimed Bob Houbregs on waivers from the Boston Celtics.

December 10, 1954
 The Rochester Royals sold Alex Hannum to the Milwaukee Hawks.

January 10, 1955
 The New York Knicks  signed Bob Peterson as a free agent.

January 12, 1955
 The New York Knicks  signed Paul Hoffman as a free agent.

February 15, 1955
 The New York Knicks sold Paul Hoffman to the Philadelphia Warriors.

April 28, 1955
 Les Harrison resigns as head coach for Rochester Royals.
 The Rochester Royals hired Bobby Wanzer as head coach.

May 12, 1955
 The Philadelphia Warriors sold Zeke Zawoluk to the Rochester Royals.

Notes
 Number of years played in the NBA prior to the draft
 Career with the franchise that drafted the player
 Never played a game for the franchise

External links
NBA Transactions at NBA.com
1954-55 NBA Transactions| Basketball-Reference.com

References

Transactions
1954-55